From 1789 to 1796, Georgia governors George Walton, Edward Telfair, and George Mathews, while in office, made gifts of land grants covering more than three times as much land as Georgia then contained. In all they made grants of 29,097,866 acres (117,755 km²) of land in counties that consisted of only 8,717,960 acres (35,280 km²).

In Montgomery County alone, with an area of 407,680 acres (1,650 km²), three men received land grants totaling 2,664,000 acres (10,780 km²). All the grants given in Montgomery County totaled 7,436,995 acres (30,096 km²). While single grants were limited to a maximum of 1,000 acres (4 km²) per person, multiple 1,000-acre (4 km²) grants were given to individuals. The land was portrayed as fertile when in reality it was a pine barren.

The Pine Barrens speculation is often conflated with the Yazoo land scandal, which occurred at about the same time and dealt with land in present-day Alabama and Mississippi. The Yazoo scandal "quickly overshadowed" the Pine Barrens scandal. In the Yazoo case, the Georgia legislature authorized sales of millions of acres of land at low prices, to enable speculation by political insiders. It led to a landmark United States Supreme Court decision in 1810, Fletcher v. Peck.

References

Further reading
 Abbe, Mary Hoit, Georgia Colonial and Headright Plat Index, 1735-1866 [electronic resource] (2005).
 Cadle, Farris W., Georgia Land Surveying History and Law (1991). Athens, Ga.: University of Georgia Press.

History of Georgia (U.S. state)